Giuseppe Zannoni (1849 -  1903) was an Italian painter.

Biography

Born in Verona, Zannoni studied at the Cignaroli Academy, receiving prizes at local exhibitions from 1865 to 1871. He travelled to Milan with his cousin, the sculptor Ugo Zannoni, and enrolled in the Brera Academy, where he was a pupil of Giuseppe Bertini. In 1877 he exhibited the painting Marc Anthony reveals the bloody cloak of Caesar to the Roman people in Naples; In 1891 in Milan, with three genre paintings: Arrivo degli sposi; Trastulli e ammonizioni; Cacciatore e volpe. In 1884 in Rome he exhibited: Stanchezza; Vendemmia; Scorciatoia; Manca l ' acqua alle cascine; Lungo il Torrente di Val di Muggio, and Genio in erba. Among other works Il piasto; L'ozio ingannato (1874); La favorita, and La preghiera. In 1887 in Venice he exhibited: Sentinella; In assenza della nonna; Studi in cucina; Nella stalla; Prima neve and Buon giorno. In 1891, he sent to the Brera annual exhibition: Luna di miele and Al mercato.

He also painted frescoes in various churches, mainly in Verona, including the church of the Filippini, where in 1890, he painted a Sacred Heart and Saints and an Assumption of Mary for the church of Santa Maria alla Porta, Milan. He died from the consequences of a fall from a scaffold on May 28, at Monteforte d'Alpone, ten days after beginning to paint the Trinity fresco at the apse of the local parish church.

References

1849 births
1903 deaths
19th-century Italian painters
20th-century Italian painters
20th-century Italian male artists
Accidental deaths from falls
Accidental deaths in Italy
Brera Academy alumni
Italian male painters
Painters from Verona
19th-century Italian male artists